Riverside is a ghost town located in Lafayette County, Mississippi, United States.

The settlement began in 1838 as a farming community on the south side of the Tallahatchie River.

The first settlers were Uriah Temple and P.M. Duncan.

An early post office at Riverside was discontinued in 1910.

References

Former populated places in Lafayette County, Mississippi
Ghost towns in Mississippi